Events from the year 1835 in France.

Incumbents
 Monarch – Louis Philippe I

Events
 March – Balzac's novel Le Père Goriot is first published in book form.
 July 28 – In Paris, the assassination of Louis Philippe I is attempted by Giuseppe Marco Fieschi using a home-made volley gun. Eighteen are killed but the King escapes with a minor wound.
 August – The September Laws ban all criticism of Louis Philippe and regulate publications and the theatre.
The French word for their language changes to français, from françois.
Charles-Louis Havas creates Havas, the first French news agency (which later spawns Agence France-Presse).

Births
18 April - François Perrier, general and geodesist (died 1888)
15 May - Émile Léonard Mathieu, mathematician (died 1890)
31 May - Alphonse-Marie-Adolphe de Neuville, painter (died 1885)
31 July - Henri Brisson, statesman and Prime minister of France (died 1912)
2 October - Louis-Antoine Ranvier, physician, pathologist, anatomist and histologist (died 1922)
9 October - Camille Saint-Saëns, composer, organist, conductor (died 1921)

Full date unknown
Frédéric Febvre, actor (died 1916)

Deaths
8 February - Guillaume Dupuytren, anatomist and military surgeon (born 1777)
10 April - Pierre Clement de Laussat, politician, last French Governor of Louisiana (born 1756)
24 June - Jacques Claude Beugnot, politician (born 1761)
25 July - François René Mallarmé, politician (born 1755)
28 July - Édouard Adolphe Casimir Joseph Mortier, Marshal of France (born 1768)
18 September - Jean Joseph Antoine de Courvoisier, magistrate and politician (born 1775)
17 December - Pierre Louis Roederer, politician, economist, and historian (born 1754)

Full date unknown
Hippolyte Pixii, instrument maker (born 1808)

References

1830s in France